De Haar is a hamlet in the Dutch province of Drenthe. It is located in the municipality of Hoogeveen, about 7 km northeast of that town. 

It was first mentioned in 1936 as Haar, and means "sandy ridge". It is considered part of Tiendeveen, and has about 85 houses.

References

Populated places in Drenthe
Hoogeveen